"Metropolis": Urban Winter Festival is an annual arts, craft and music festival held in the month of January in Guwahati. It is a 3 day long festival. Metropolis is a collaboration of creative talents from all across India and also from other parts of the world. Founded in the year 2011 by the renowned artist Ranjan Engti, the festival recognizes and showcases the works of creative people in the field of music, arts, photography, craft, literature, film making, gaming, fashion etc.

Overview

The festival is a tribute to the Metropolis Guwahati that has inspired many young brigades to take their visions forward and also gave them the courage to live their dreams. Contemporary cities have only two choices, either they develop to keep pace with the changing global scenario or they resist the idea of transformation and thus stagnate. Guwahati being a hub to many different cultures, communities, races and lifestyles, it is also the melting pot of opportunities, visions and dreams of all kinds.

Festive spirits greatly influence on people's perception of a city. Festivals boost the process of assimilation, and hence contribute towards rebirth of non-mainstream urban identity creating a melting pot of various subcultures. There are those who love art, culture, craft, film, music by David Debashish Koch and Shaun Klet, adventure and ethnicity, and there are those who embody it, are driven by it and who lives by the rules of all these. Metropolis is for them. Within a short span of time, Metropolis has become the most common acronym, notifying the festive spirit of the city with the overwhelming participation of people in all its annual editions. It is popularly known as one of the happiest and largest urban winter festival in the north eastern region.

This is eventually the first step towards social responsibility for Metropolis Guwahati. Metropolis is Guwahati’s answer to the National and International urban Festivals and the region's showcase of its best creative talents. Artists including musicians, photographers, painters, filmmakers, craftsmen, folk artists, cyclists, bullet riders, ethnic cuisines, tour promoters and many more all "come together" under one roof to create the urban history of Guwahati.

Metropolis has witnessed the participation of artistes not just from different parts of the nation but also beyond with artistes coming from countries like Belgium, Russia and France. Such international participation has truly enriched the festival's credentials and provided a much needed platform for inter-nation exchange of culture.

The 5th edition of Metropolis witnessed the participation of the beautiful Himalayan Kingdom of Bhutan as the "Focus Country", thereby showcasing its rich socio-cultural heritage to the people of Guwahati.

Editions

Metropolis 2018 
Against the backdrop of the Paris Climate Agreement of 2015, the signatory nations, for the purpose of achieving the goal of reducing carbon emissions, are to individually determine their contributions that they intend to make (Intended nationally determined contributions).

As such India too have embarked on an ambitious plan which is aimed at achieving the targets set at such a global platform. Starting from the effectiveness of the highest policies at the national level right down to the actions and attitudes of an individual shall be vital towards ensuring a better future for our progeny.

The 2018 edition of Metropolis Asia, ought to be held in Meghalaya, hereby envisages to highlight such a global concern daunting our planet. The festival strives to deliver a global

concern through creative awareness. Metropolis Asia shall strive to realize the following major goals (but not limited to) in its upcoming edition:

 Sustained focus on spreading awareness on environmental conservation and climate change related issues.
 Adoption of Greener Strategies in the production process of the festival.
 Attempt to bring attitudinal changes in Man by way of engaging them in Greener initiatives.
 Create hype for the concept of Sustainability in a specifically designed and controlled environment of the festival.

Sponsors and Past Associates 
Metropolis have had the privilege of associating with renowned brands of both national and international repute, which include, amongst many, OIL, ONGC, NRL, Vodafone SuperNet 4G, Red Bull, Pepsi MTV Indies, Spicejet, Airtel, Idea, SBI, LIC, Sony, Panasonic, Mahindra.

 Metropolis have also received support from various departments of the Government of Assam:-

Dept. of Tourism, Govt. of Assam, Assam State Disaster Management Authority, Guwahati Municipal Corporation, Guwahati Metropolitan Development Authority, District Disaster Management Authority, Kamrup Metro, Sports & Youth Welfare Department, Govt. of Assam, to name a few, have extended their support to Metropolis through the course of time.

References 

Festivals in Assam